The Martin Himler House in Beauty in Martin County, Kentucky was listed on the National Register of Historic Places in 1991.

It was home of Martin Himler, who founded the Himler Coal Company.

It is a two-story wood-frame and weatherboarded house on a brick foundation.  It sits upon a hill overlooking Beauty, which formerly was known as Himlerville.

See also 
 Himlerville, Kentucky
 National Register of Historic Places listings in Martin County, Kentucky

References

Houses on the National Register of Historic Places in Kentucky
Houses completed in 1922
National Register of Historic Places in Martin County, Kentucky
Dutch Colonial Revival architecture in the United States
1922 establishments in Kentucky
Unused buildings in Kentucky